The University of the Philippines Los Baños (UPLB), also referred to as UP Los Baños or colloquially as Elbi, is a public research university primarily located in the towns of Los Baños and Bay in the province of Laguna, some 65 kilometers southeast of Manila. It traces its roots to the UP College of Agriculture (UPCA), which was founded in 1909 by the American colonial government to promote agricultural education and research in the Philippines. American botanist Edwin Copeland served as its first dean. UPLB was formally established in 1972 following the union of UPCA with four other Los Baños and Diliman-based University of the Philippines (UP) units.

The university has played an influential role in Asian agriculture and biotechnology due to its pioneering efforts in plant breeding and bioengineering, particularly in the development of high-yielding and pest-resistant crops. In recognition of its work, it was awarded the Ramon Magsaysay Award for International Understanding in 1977. Six of its research units are classified as Centers of Excellence in Research via Presidential decree, and it hosts a number of local and international research centers, including the International Rice Research Institute (IRRI), ASEAN Center for Biodiversity, World Agroforestry Centre, and the Southeast Asian Regional Center for Graduate Study and Research in Agriculture (SEARCA).

UPLB offers more than 100 degree programs in various disciplines through its nine colleges and two schools, 29 of which are undergraduate degree programs. As of 2021, nine academic programs were recognized by the Commission on Higher Education as Centers of Excellence while one program was recognized as Center of Development.

UPLB alumni have been recognized in a wide range of fields. They include 16 scientists awarded the title National Scientist of the Philippines, members of the United Nations Intergovernmental Panel on Climate Change, Palanca Award winners, as well as political and business leaders.

History

UPLB was originally established as the University of the Philippines College of Agriculture (UPCA) on March 6, 1909, by the UP Board of Regents. Edwin Copeland, an American botanist and Thomasite from the Philippine Normal College in Manila, was its first dean. Classes began in June 1909 with five professors while 12 students initially enrolled in the program.

During the Japanese occupation of the Philippines, UPCA was closed and the campus converted into an internment camp for allied nationals and a headquarters of the Japanese army. For three years, the college was home to more than 2,000 civilians, mostly Americans, that were captured by the Japanese. In 1945, as part of the liberation of the Philippines, the US Army sent 130 11th Airborne Division paratroopers to Los Baños to rescue the internees. Only four paratroopers and two Filipino guerrillas were killed in the raid. However, Japanese reinforcements arrived two days later, destroying UPCA facilities and killing some 1,500 Filipino civilians in Los Baños soon afterwards.

UPCA became the first unit of the University of the Philippines to open after the war, with Leopoldo Uichanco as dean. However, only 125 (16 percent) of the original students enrolled. It was even worse for the School of Forestry, which only had nine students. Likewise, only 38 professors returned to teach. UPCA used its ₱470,546 (US$10,800) share in the Philippine-US War Damage Funds (released in 1947) for reconstruction.

Further financial endowments from the United States Agency for International Development (USAID) and the Mutual Security Agency (MSA) allowed the construction of new facilities, while scholarship grants, mainly from the Rockefeller Foundation and the International Cooperation Administration, helped fund the training of UPCA faculty. From 1947 to 1958, a total of 146 faculty members had been granted MS and PhD scholarships in US universities.

Dioscoro Umali became UPCA dean in 1959. Umali's administration oversaw the creation of IRRI, SEARCA (of which he was the first director), and the Department of Food Science and Technology. New facilities were also constructed under his Five-Year Development Program.

Cornell University was instrumental in the post-war rebuilding of UP's Los Baños colleges. The Cornell-Los Baños project, implemented in 1952 to 1960, involved the rebuilding of UPCA's physical plant and Central Experiment Station, procurement of scientific equipment, and upgrading of teaching standards. A similar undertaking between Cornell, Syracuse University, the State University of New York, and the UP College of Forestry was implemented between 1957 to 1963. A "sister university relationship" was formally established in 1962 through the UP-Cornell Graduate Education program, which sought to develop and expand UP's agricultural education, research and extension programs, and to strengthen Cornell's own international agricultural development program. The program ended in 1972.

The 1969 Philippine balance of payments crisis under the Ferdinand Marcos government marked the beginning of a prolonged period of social unrest across the country, including in UP Los Baños. This period of unrest, which included the First Quarter Storm, coincided with another issue, which was the call for the UP College of Agriculture to become independent from the University of the Philippines in Diliman.

When martial law was declared in September 1972, Marcos cracked down on any form of criticism or activism, leading to the arrest, torture and/or killing of Los Baños residents. Those killed included Modesto "Bong" Sison, and Manuel Bautista, while Aloysius Baes was among those who were arrested and tortured. Those who went missing ("desaparecidos") included Tish Ladlad, Cristina Catalla, Gerardo "Gerry" Faustino, Rizalina Ilagan, Ramon Jasul, and Jessica Sales. 

Later in 1972, UPCA formally requested Ferdinand Marcos to allow the college to secede from the University of the Philippines due to the alleged withholding of its budget and the disapproval of curricular proposals. However, UP President Salvador P. Lopez strongly opposed the idea. A survey also found that there was very little support for complete independence at UPCA. As a compromise, Lopez proposed the transformation of UP into a system of autonomous constituent universities. Finally, on November 20, 1972, Presidential Decree No. 58 was signed, establishing UPLB as UP's first autonomous campus, with UPCA, College of Forestry, Agricultural Credit and Cooperatives Institute, Dairy Training and Research Institute, and the Diliman-based Agrarian Reform Institute as its first academic units. New colleges and research centers were created over the next few years, while the College of Veterinary Medicine was likewise transferred to UPLB from UP Diliman.

The establishment of UPLB as an autonomous campus also saw the establishment of the UPLB Perspective as its student paper in 1973 – earning it the distinction of being one of the first student newspapers to be allowed to publish after the September 1972 martial law crackdown on newspapers and other media establishments.

Violent crime incidents in the UPLB community, with some resulting in the deaths of students (Eileen Sarmenta and Allan Gomez in 1993, Given Grace Cebanico in 2011, Ray Bernard Peñaranda and Maria Victoria Reyes in 2012) were widely covered by the national media. As a result, national government agencies, the local government of Los Baños, and the university administration have enacted more stringent security measures.

In recent years, the government launched new construction projects in UPLB. These include the construction of a new main library, the Food Processing Research and Development Center, the Agricultural and Economic Development Studies Center, and a microbial bank for the BIOTECH Philippine National Collection of Microorganisms.

Campus

The UPLB campus consists of  spread across the provinces of Laguna, Negros Occidental, and Quezon.

Los Baños campus

The  Los Baños campus houses UPLB's academic facilities, as well as experimental farms for agriculture and biotechnology research. The more prominent buildings in the Los Baños campus, such as the Dioscoro L. Umali Hall, Main Library, and Student Union were designed by National Artist for Architecture Leandro Locsin. Other notable landmarks include the iconic Oblation, Alumni Plaza, Freedom Park, and Baker Memorial Hall.

UPLB is designated as caretaker of the  Makiling Forest Reserve (often referred to as the "upper campus," in contrast to the "lower campus" set at the foot of Makiling). It houses facilities of the College of Forestry and Natural Resources, College of Public Affairs, UPLB Museum of Natural History and the University Health Service, among others. The reserve is home to diverse flora and fauna, and has more tree species than the continental United States (an area 32 times bigger than the Philippines). It serves as an outdoor laboratory for faculty and students of the university.

Land grants

UPLB has three major land grants: the Laguna-Quezon Land Grant, La Carlota Land Grant, and Laguna Land Grant.

The  Laguna-Quezon Land Grant is located in the towns of Real, Quezon, and Siniloan, Laguna, and was acquired in February 1930. It covers some portions of the Sierra Madre mountain range, and currently hosts the university's Citronella and lemongrass plantations. The  La Carlota Land Grant is situated in Negros Occidental, a province in the Western Visayas region. Acquired in May 1964, it houses the PCARRD-DOST La Granja Agricultural Research Center, which serves as a research center for various upland crops. Meanwhile, the  Laguna Land Grant located in Paete, Laguna, also acquired in 1964, is mostly undeveloped. Numerous parties have expressed interest in developing the land grants; however, UPLB has not entertained the potential investors due to the "lack of a solid development plan."

Panabo Professional School

The UP Professional School for Agriculture and the Environment (UP PSAE) in Panabo City was established in 2016 to cater to agribusiness professionals in the Davao metropolitan area. Supervised by the UPLB Graduate School, UP PSAE was established through a grant by Damosa Land Inc., a leading property developer in Mindanao.

Organization and administration

As part of the University of the Philippines System, UPLB is governed by the 11-person UP Board of Regents, which is jointly chaired by the head of the Commission on Higher Education and the UP president.

The Board of Regents has the authority to approve the institution, merger, and abolition of degree programs as recommended by the UP president. It also has the power to confer degrees. The UP president, who is appointed by the Board of Regents, is the university's chief executive officer and the head of the faculty.

UPLB is administered by a chancellor who is elected by the UP Board of Regents to a three-year term. The chancellor may only serve for up to two terms. Under him are five vice-chancellors specializing in administration, community affairs, instruction, planning and development, and research and extension.

The current chancellor is Dr Jose Camacho, the tenth to hold the office.

UPLB, through the UP System, is a member of the Association of Pacific Rim Universities, a consortium of leading research universities in the Asia-Pacific region.

Student government

The University Student Council (USC) is the "highest governing body of all UPLB students." Together with college student councils (CSCs), it assembles as the Student Legislative Chamber and acts as the highest policy-making body of the USC. The USC is composed of a chairperson, vice-chairperson, 10 councilors, a representative for each college/school with less than 500 students, and an additional college representative for every 500 students in excess of the first 500. Members are given one-year terms. CSCs have a similar structure, but with a different number of councilors based on the student population.

The Student Disciplinary Tribunal (SDT) is responsible for sanctioning erring students. Common offenses include student misconduct and fraternity rumbles. The SDT is composed of a chairperson, two appointees of the chancellor, a student juror, and a parent juror.

Academics

UPLB offers undergraduate and graduate degree programs through its nine colleges and two schools. Most of these programs award science degrees. It also awards high school diplomas through the University of the Philippines Rural High School (UPRHS), a subunit of the College of Arts and Sciences, which acts as a laboratory for its BS Math and Science Teaching students.

Admission and graduation

UPLB admits more than 2,500 students and produces about 1,800 graduates every year. Undergraduate admission is determined by the University of the Philippines College Admission Test (UPCAT). Examinees that select UPLB as their preferred campus and garner a University Predicted Grade (UPG) within the standard cut-off are automatically eligible for admission. Those who do not automatically qualify may file an appeal for reconsideration if their UPG is within the actual cut-off, though the appeal process does not guarantee admission. The cut-off scores may be adjusted according to a variety of factors. In 2010 and 2011, UPLB had a standard UPG cut-off of 2.42 while the actual cut-off was 2.8. But in 2014 and 2015, UPLB had a standard cut off score of 2.3. Seventy percent of slots are given to incoming freshmen with the highest scores, while the remaining thirty percent are given to public high school students and members of minority groups. Before the UPCAT was used for admission, UPCA only admitted the top 5 percent of Philippine high school graduates.

High school freshman admission, on the other hand, is determined by the eight-hour-long UPRHS Entrance Examination. Only the top 125 examinees are admitted. Sophomore transferees take the two-day UPRHS Validation Examination, and are admitted depending on the available slots.

Normally, a student who completes the program may graduate with honors if his general weighted average (GWA) is 1.75 or above. The title summa cum laude is awarded to graduates who obtain a GWA of 1.20 or above, magna cum laude to graduates with a GWA of 1.45 to 1.20, and cum laude to graduates with a GWA of between 1.75 and 1.45. As of 2011 there have been 30 summa cum laudes who have graduated from UPLB.

Tuition and financial aid
With the passage of Republic Act 10931, tuition and fees have been waived for students pursuing their degrees for the first time in exchange for return service, although it is possible to opt out and pay the full tuition instead.

Before this law was passed, the base tuition fee per unit in UPLB was ₱1,000 (US$23). Along with other UP constituents, UPLB implemented the Socialized Tuition and Financial Assistance Program (STFAP), wherein students with annual family incomes between ₱1,000,000 (US$23,000) and ₱500,000 (US$11,500) were charged the base tuition fee; students with annual family incomes between ₱500,000 and ₱135,000 (US$3,110) were charged ₱600 (US$14) per unit; those whose incomes fell between ₱135,000 and ₱80,000 (US$1,840) were charged ₱300 (US$7); while those whose incomes fell below ₱80,000 were not charged any fees. Those with annual family incomes above ₱1,000,000 were charged ₱1,500 (US$35) per unit.

Accreditation

UPLB is identified by the Commission on Higher Education as a Center of Excellence in Agriculture, Agricultural Engineering, Biology, Forestry, Information Technology, Environmental Science, Development Communication, Statistics and Veterinary Medicine, as well as a Center of Development in Chemical Engineering. Five undergraduate programs were given the ASEAN University Network-Quality Assessment certification: BS Biology, BS Agricultural and Biosystems Engineering, BS Development Communication, BS Forestry and BS Agriculture.

Libraries and collections

As of 2007, UPLB's 12 libraries, collectively referred to as the University Library, hold a total of 346,061 volumes. It periodically receives publications from United Nations agencies (including the UNFAO, UN-HABITAT and UNU) and the World Bank. It is a contributor to the International Information System for Agricultural Services and Technology, contributing nearly 30,000 titles between 1975 and 2010.

195,282 of these volumes are housed at the Main Library, while the rest are in unit libraries. The Main Library also houses theses, digital sources, and 1,215 serial titles, among other materials.

One of UPLB's unit libraries is the College of Veterinary Medicine-Animal and Dairy Sciences Cluster Library. It claims to hold the largest collection on veterinary and animal sciences in the country.

UPLB manages the UPLB Museum of Natural History, which was established in 1976 at the foothills of Mt. Makiling. It holds over 600,000 biological specimens, including half of the specimens from the Philippine Water Bug Inventory Project, and a third of the Dioscoro S. Rabor Wildlife Collection. More than half of the specimens belong to the entomological collection. While most of its collections are in its main building, some are housed in other UPLB units.

Research

Six research institutes were named Centers of Excellence in Research via Presidential decree: Institute of Plant Breeding, Institute of Food Science and Technology, Institute of Animal Science, National Crop Protection Center, Farming Systems and Soil Resources Institute, and National Institute of Molecular Biology and Biotechnology.

UPLB hosts a number of international research institutes, including the Southeast Asian Regional Center for Graduate Study and Research in Agriculture, the ASEAN Center for Biodiversity, the International Rice Research Institute, the World Fish Center, the World Agroforestry Center, and the Asia Rice Foundation. The APEC Center for Technology Exchange and Training for Small and Medium Enterprises (ACTETSME), established in 1996 through the initiative of then President Fidel V. Ramos during the Asia-Pacific Economic Cooperation (APEC) Leaders' Meeting in Seattle, USA, is also located at the university's Science & Technology Park. Local research institutions such as the Department of Environment and Natural Resources' Ecosystems Research and Development Bureau, Department of Science and Technology's Forest Products Research and Development Institute, and Department of Agriculture's Philippine Carabao Center are headquartered or have offices at the university. The main office of IRRI's Philippine counterpart, the Philippine Rice Research Institute, used to be located at UPLB but was transferred to Muñoz, Nueva Ecija in 1990. It continues to maintain a research office at the university.

Three UPLB-published journals, the Philippine Agricultural Scientist, the Philippine Journal of Veterinary Medicine, and the Journal of Environmental Sciences and Management are listed in the SCImago Journal Rankings. SCImago gave these an h-index (a measure of "actual scientific productivity" and "apparent scientific impact") of 13, 4 and 8, respectively. These journals are also listed in the ISI Web of Knowledge, along with two other UPLB-published journals: the Philippine Entomologist and the Philippine Journal of Crop Science.

Biotechnology research

One of the earliest innovations of UPLB was the production of CAC 87 sugar cane in 1919. This high-yielding variety is resistant to fiji and mosaic viruses, and produces more sucrose than other varieties. Its derivatives significantly increased sugar cane production in the Philippines. Between 1921 and 1939, cattle, poultry, and swine breeding programs produced new breeds, namely the Philamin (a hybrid of the Hereford, Nellore and native cattle), Berkjala (a variety of the Berkshire and local Jala-Jala pig, resistant to hog cholera) and the Los Baños Cantonese chicken, which produces more eggs.

Research in the 1960s allowed for the efficient mass production of macapuno (a type of coconut with jelly-like meat), while studies started in 1998 that produced delayed-ripening papaya continue to this day. In 1974, UPLB researchers discovered mango flower induction by potassium nitrate, making it possible for the fruit to be available year-round. It is credited for tripling yield and for "revolutionizing" the country's mango industry.

In 2009, UPLB researchers funded by the Department of Agriculture developed an abacá variety that is resistant to the abaca bunchy top virus. The university is working further to make it resistant to mosaic and abacá bract mosaic viruses.

In July 2010, UPLB announced that the Leucinodes orbonalis-resistant Bacillus thuringiensis (Bt) eggplant variety that it had been developing with Cornell University and Mahyco was ready for commercialization. On February 17, 2011, Filipino and Indian Greenpeace activists trespassed UPLB's Bay research farm and uprooted two Bt eggplants and more than 100 non-genetically modified eggplants. The National Academy of Science and Technology and ranking UPLB officials condemned the incident, and have taken legal action.

Biofuel research

Pioneering efforts in biofuel research have been conducted at the university. Studies conducted in the 1930s found that gasoline with 15–20 percent ethanol, dubbed "gasanol", was more efficient than pure gasoline. Biofuel research in 2007 under the National Biofuel Program has considered new sources of biofuel, such as coconuts, Moringa oleifera, and sunflower seeds. Efforts have been concentrated on the Jatropha curcas due to its low maintenance and fast yield. Other fuel, such as coconut biofuel, were found to be too costly. Biofuel from Sorghum bicolor, Manihot esculenta crantz and Chlorella vulgaris are also being studied.

Nanotechnology research

UPLB's nanotechnology program focuses on research and innovation in agriculture, food, and forest products. It has developed nanosensors and nanostructured materials from agriculture by-products, helping improve agricultural productivity. Moreover, it has developed and commercialized "nanofertilizers" that can be substituted for synthetic fertilizers. Researchers found that these nanofertilizers reduced fertilizer application by up to 50 percent compared with using conventional fertilizers, and are less likely to cause soil toxicity and imbalance. Studies showed that using the nanofertilizers increased the net profit of farmers by 40 percent in rice, 20 percent in corn, and 48 percent in potato. It also increased eggplant yield by 36 percent, cabbage by 5 percent, and cane tonnage by 46 percent. Significant increases in yield were also observed for coffee, cacao, and banana. In 2021, the government launched a program to optimize the manufacturing of these nanofertilizers.

Student life

In 2008, 2,170 students were housed in the eight dormitories managed by UPLB. In the academic year 2011–2012, fees for all UPLB dormitories increased by at least 25 percent from the previous rate of ₱350 (US$8) a month. As with the previous dormitory fee increase of 221 percent in 1997, making the dormitories "financially self-supporting" was one of the reasons cited by the University Housing Office for the revision. The move was widely criticized by various groups. The University Housing Office projects ₱13,818,000 (US$322,000) in revenue for 2010 with a deficit of ₱586,465.59 (US$13,600). according to official estimates. The new dormitories are expected to accommodate 192 persons annually.

Student organizations

As of May 2020, there are 159 recognized student organizations in UPLB. Of these, 68 are academic, 15 cultural, one international, eight religious, 30 socio-civic, six sports and recreational, 11 varsitarian, 13 fraternities, and 7 sororities. There are also a number of organizations that exist but are not officially recognized by the university. Regional organizations were not recognized by UPLB prior to September 2008, when the University of the Philippines board of regents repealed Chapter 72 Article 444 of the 1984 University of the Philippines Code, which states that "organizations which are provincial, sectional or regional in nature shall not be allowed in the University System." Likewise, Section 3 of the code states that "the University of the Philippines System is a public, secular, non-profit institution of higher learning." Due to this, religious organizations have had some difficulty in getting recognized. Only recognized organizations are allowed to use UPLB facilities. The system of student organizations in UPLB is different from that of other UP constituents in that freshmen are not allowed to join any organization until they have earned at least 30 units.

Loyalty Day

Every October 10, UPLB celebrates Loyalty Day, which has also become UPLB's alumni homecoming. The celebration commemorates events in 1918 when more than half of students and faculty (193 out of 300 students and 27 out of 32 faculty), including two women, enlisted in the Philippine National Guard for service in France during World War I. The volunteers never saw action as the Allied Forces signed an armistice with Germany during the same year, essentially ending the war.

Feb Fair

The university holds a major campus fair, known as "Feb Fair", during Valentine's week. The fair was initially held to express opposition to martial law under Philippine President Ferdinand Marcos, who abolished student organizations and student councils.

Media

The militant UPLB Perspective is the official student publication of UPLB. The university administration has been repeatedly criticized for allegedly interfering in the selection process of its editor-in-chief. Other campus publications include UPLB Horizon and UPLB Link. Meanwhile, the College of Development Communication (CDC) publishes the experimental community newspaper Los Baños Times.

CDC runs the radio station DZLB 1116, the oldest educational radio station in the Philippines. Founded in August 1964 with a broadcast power of 250 watts at 1210 kHz, the station serves as a distance education tool and training facility. It currently operates through a five-kilowatt transmitter located near the main gate of the campus. The station was the 1994 recipient of the KBP Golden Dove Award for Best AM Radio Station as well as a Catholic Mass Media Award for Best Educational Radio Program in 2010.

People

People associated with the university include alumni, faculty, and honorary degree recipients. They include 16 out of 41 National Scientists of the Philippines: Eduardo A. Quisimbing, 1980 (Plant Taxonomy, Systematics, and Morphology), Francisco M. Fronda, 1983 (Animal Husbandry), Francisco O. Santos, 1983 (Human Nutrition and Agricultural Chemistry), Julian A. Banzon, 1986 (Chemistry), Dioscoro L. Umali, 1986 (Agriculture and Rural Development), Pedro E. Escuro, 1994 (Genetics and Plant Breeding), Dolores A. Ramirez, 1998 (Biochemical Genetics and Cytogenetics), Jose R. Velasco, 1998 (Plant Physiology), Gelia T. Castillo, 1999 (Rural Sociology), Bienvenido O. Juliano, 2000 (Organic Chemistry), Clare R. Baltazar, 2001 (Systematic Entomology), Benito S. Vergara, 2001 (Plant Physiology), Ricardo M. Lantican, 2005 (Plant Breeding), Teodulfo M. Topacio, Jr., 2008 (Veterinary Medicine), Ramon C. Barba, 2014 (Horticulture), and Emil Q. Javier, 2019 (Agriculture). Meanwhile, four UPLB scientists are members of the United Nations Intergovernmental Panel on Climate Change that won the Nobel Prize in 2007: Rex Victor Cruz, Felino P. Lansigan, Rodel D. Lasco, and Juan M. Pulhin. Scientist Romulo G. Davide was given a Ramon Magsaysay Award in 2012 for "his steadfast passion in placing the power and discipline of science in the hands of Filipino farmers".

UPLB alumni have served as senior government officials under various administrations. Those currently in office include Senate President Juan Miguel Zubiri, House of Representatives Deputy Speaker Isidro Ungab, Socioeconomic Planning Secretary Arsenio Balisacan, and Makati City mayor Abigail Binay. Trade and Industry Secretary Alfredo Pascual was a faculty member prior to his appointment.

Both of its honorary degree recipients held influential roles in their respective countries' politics. They are Salim Ahmed Salim, former Prime Minister of Tanzania, and Sirindhorn, Princess of Thailand.

Former UP presidents Bienvenido Maria Gonzalez (1939–1943; 1945–1951), Emil Q. Javier (1993-1999) and Emerlinda R. Roman (2005-2011) graduated from UPLB, along with the sitting chancellors of UP Baguio, UP Mindanao, and UP Open University. Alumni who held ranking posts at other academic and research institutions include Jikun Huang, Founder and Director of the Center for Chinese Agricultural Policy of the Chinese Academy of Sciences, Kyu-Seong Lee, Director-General of South Korea's Rural Development Administration, and Weerapon Thongma, President of Maejo University in Thailand.

San Miguel Corporation Chairman and CEO Eduardo Cojuangco Jr. and Bounty Agro Ventures President Ronald Daniel Mascariñas also attended UPLB.

See also
 University of the Philippines
 University of the Philippines Baguio
 University of the Philippines Cebu
 University of the Philippines Diliman
 University of the Philippines Manila
 University of the Philippines Mindanao
 University of the Philippines Open University
 University of the Philippines Visayas

References

External links

 University of the Philippines System
 University of the Philippines Los Baños

 
Universities and colleges in Laguna (province)
Research universities in the Philippines
Educational institutions established in 1909
1909 establishments in the Philippines
Education in Los Baños, Laguna
Forestry education
History of forestry education